Harpalus vittatus is a species of ground beetle in the subfamily Harpalinae. It was described by Gelber in 1833.

References

vittatus
Beetles described in 1833